Cosway is a surname. Notable people with the surname include:

 Maria Cosway (1760–1838), painter
 Richard Cosway (1742–1821), painter

See also
 Cosway, Alberta
 Antoinette Cosway, a character in the novel Wide Sargasso Sea (a version of the Jane Eyre character Bertha Mason)